The Carlos Palanca Memorial Awards for Literature winners in the year 1959 (rank, title of winning entry, name of author).


English division
Short story
First prize: "The God Stealer" by Francisco SioJose
Second prize: "The Giants" by Kerima Polotan Tuvera
Third prize: "On the Ferry" by N.V.M. Gonzales

One-act play
First prize: "In the Tangled Snare" by Epifanio San Juan Jr.
Second prize: No Winner
Third prize: "Scent of Fear" by Jesus T. Peralta

Filipino (Tagalog) division
Short story in Filipino
First prize: "Dayuhan" by Buenaventura S. Medina Jr.
Second prize: "Estero" by Pedro L Ricarte
Third prize: "Mapanglaw ang Mukha ng Buwan" by Efren Reyes Abueg

One-act play in Filipino
First prize: No Winner
Second prize: "Hagdan sa Bahaghari" by Amado V. Hernandez
Third prize: No Winner

More winners by year

References
 

1959
1959 literary awards